Eucalyptus rowleyi is a species of mallee that is endemic to the Pilbara region of Western Australia. It has smooth grey bark, lance-shaped adult leaves, flower buds in groups of seven or nine, white flowers and cylindrical to urn-shaped fruit.

Description
The bark is smooth grey to tan, and cream-coloured when new.

Taxonomy and naming
Eucalyptus rowleyi was first formally described in 2012 by Dean Nicolle and Malcolm E. French from material collected north of Newman by Ian Brooker in 1983. The description was published in the journal Nuytsia. The specific epithet (rowleyi) honours Bruce Rowley, an expert desert traveller who first discovered the Little Sandy Desert population of this species.

Distribution and habitat
This mallee usually grows on broad floodplains or in open mallee vegetation. It is only known from the area between Marble Bar, Newman and the Rudall River National Park in the Little Sandy Desert and Pilbara biogeographic regions.

Conservation status
This mallee is classified as "Priority Three" by the Western Australian Government Department of Parks and Wildlife meaning that it is poorly known and known from only a few locations but is not under imminent threat.

See also
List of Eucalyptus species

References

rowleyi
Endemic flora of Western Australia
Myrtales of Australia
Eucalypts of Western Australia
Plants described in 2012